Morimospasma granulatum is a species of beetle in the family Cerambycidae. It was described by Chiang in 1981.

References

Phrissomini
Beetles described in 1981